KZ2 is a kart racing class using 125 cc water-cooled two-stroke engines yielding about . The engines are equipped with a 6-speed gearbox. Z2 is the second fastest of the KZ karting racing categories, and technical regulations are similar to faster KZ1 except that in KZ2 the gearbox must be "hand-operated and exclusively mechanical without a servo system", as well as the use of medium tires. Both the engine and chassis must be approved by the CIK-FIA racing governing commission. The class is open to drivers aged 15 years and up with the minimum weight being 175 kg, this includes the kart and driver.

The KZ2 class used to be called Intercontinental C (ICC) and was renamed by the CIK-FIA in January 2007.

The KZ2 class is run in both national and continental championships and is popular in Europe and the USA. In the UK, since the beginning of 2019, The Motorsport UK run championship is the only British Championship and runs to CIK regulations with Le Cont tyres. The NKF Super 4 series continues as KZ UK with a minimum weight of 180 kg but has no championship status.

CIK-FIA Karting International Supercup

CIK-FIA European Championships

See also
 KF1, the top level of karting
 KF2, a KF1 feeder series
 KF3, a KF2 and KF1 feeder series
 KZ1, the fastest KZ karting racing category
 Superkart, road racing with kart sized open-wheel cars

References

External links
 CIK-FIA website

Kart racing series